El Carmen Canton is a canton of Ecuador, located in the Manabí Province.  Its capital is the town of El Carmen.  Its population at the 2001 census was 69,998.

Demographics
Ethnic groups as of the Ecuadorian census of 2010:
Mestizo  75.6%
Montubio  13.1%
Afro-Ecuadorian  6.0%
White  5.0%
Indigenous  0.1%
Other  0.2%

References

Cantons of Manabí Province